Christopher Strauli (born 13 April 1946) is an English film, television and theatre actor. He is known for appearing as Norman Binns in the British Yorkshire Television sitcom Only When I Laugh.

Early life and education
Strauli was born in Harpenden, Hertfordshire. He was educated at Felixstowe Grammar School in Felixstowe, Suffolk. After teacher-training college he gave up a career as a mathematics and science teacher to attend the Royal Academy of Dramatic Art in London.

Career
Following his education spent some years at the Bristol Old Vic, before earning some minor and supporting television roles.

Since 1969, Strauli has appeared in at least two films and over twenty-five television productions.

Strauli played Bunny Manders, the assistant to A.J. Raffles, the gentleman thief in the Yorkshire Television series Raffles (1975–1977). He later appeared as feeble hospital patient Norman Binns in the ITV sitcom Only When I Laugh, occupying a bed in a ward next to characters played by James Bolam and Peter Bowles and attended by doctor Richard Wilson. Strauli was then recruited by the show's writer, Eric Chappell, to replace Richard Beckinsale in the film version of Rising Damp (another of Chappell's shows) as a new character, John, an art student.

He appeared as Benvolio in Romeo and Juliet (1978) and Claudio in Measure for Measure (1979) as part of The BBC Television Shakespeare.

Played a leading character, Paul Hatfield, in ITV 1985-86 sitcom Full House (known as Mixed Doubles in the United States) (1985) and also featured in some of Victoria Wood's sketch shows. In recent years he has concentrated predominantly on theatre work.

He appeared in the TV movie S.O.S. Titanic (1979) as wireless operator Harold Cottam, and in 3 episodes of the 1987 television serial of Fortunes of War playing Toby Lush. He played Nigel Smith in 1 episode of: Bergerac: "Tangos in the Night" the same year.

Strauli also appeared in Doctors as Paul Woodford in "God's Gift"(2000), Down to Earth as Mr. Bell in ‘The Great Escape’(2000), and Waking the Dead, playing Duncan Sanderson MP, in Parts 1 and 2 of "False Flag" (2004)

References

External links
 strauli.co.uk, Strauli's official website
 strauli.blogspot.com, Strauli's blog
 

1946 births
English male film actors
English male soap opera actors
English male stage actors
Living people
People from Harpenden
Male actors from Hertfordshire
Alumni of RADA